Season eighteen of the television program American Experience originally aired on the PBS network in the United States on October 17, 2005 and concluded on May 22, 2006.  The season contained 13 new episodes and began with the film Two Days in October.

Episodes

References

2005 American television seasons
2006 American television seasons
American Experience